Sheikh Zayed Palace Museum, also known as "Al Ain Palace Museum", is a museum in the city of Al Ain, within the Emirate of Abu Dhabi, United Arab Emirates.

Description

The museum is based in the palace of the former UAE President, Sheikh Zayed Bin Sultan Al Nahyan (1918–2004), and his family. It was originally built in 1937 on the western side of the Al Ain Oasis, the largest oasis in Al Ain. Sheikh Zayed lived here until 1966. It was made into a museum in 1998.

The museum presents many of the rooms in the palace, including an art gallery. Many of the rooms are of the majlis (meeting room for receiving visitors) type. In one of the courts there is a replica grand court tent, representing a link with Bedouin life. There is also a Land Rover similar to the one driven by Sheikh Zayed in the desert to visit Bedouin communities. Behind the museum is the Al Ain Oasis, with an entrance close by, and a path leading through the oasis to the Al Ain National Museum.

See also
 Al Jahili Fort
 Cultural policy in Abu Dhabi
 List of cultural property of national significance in the United Arab Emirates
 List of museums in the United Arab Emirates
 Tawam (region)

References

External links

 Al Ain Palace Museum web page

Al-Mutawa'ah, Al-Ain
1998 establishments in the United Arab Emirates
Houses completed in 1910
Museums established in 1998
Museums in Al Ain
Art museums and galleries in the United Arab Emirates
Zayed, Sheikh
Historic house museums in the United Arab Emirates
Palaces in the United Arab Emirates
Former palaces